Honing may refer to:

 Honing (metalworking), machining a surface by scrubbing an abrasive stone against it
 Sharpening edged tools with a manual hone
 Honing, Norfolk, English village

People with the surname
 Henkjan Honing (born 1959), Dutch musician
 Yuri Honing (born 1965), Dutch saxophonist

See also 
 Hone, the machine tool used in honing (metalworking) 
 Homing (disambiguation)